Thrincophora lignigerana is a moth of the  family Tortricidae. It is found in Australia, including Tasmania and South Australia.

The wingspan is about 28 mm. The forewings are whitish-brown suffused and irregularly spotted and blotched with dark fuscous-brown. The hindwings are pale-grey, with faintly darker strigulae.

References

Moths described in 1863
Archipini